Diddlebury is a civil parish in Shropshire, England.  It contains 40 listed buildings that are recorded in the National Heritage List for England.  Of these, three are at Grade II*, the middle of the three grades, and the others are at Grade II, the lowest grade.  The parish contains the village of Diddlebury and smaller settlements including Bouldon, Corfton, and Peaton, and is almost entirely rural.  Most of the listed buildings are houses, cottages, farmhouses and farm buildings, many of which are basically timber framed.  The other listed buildings include a church with Saxon origins, a country house developed from a medieval castle, a former manor house, a Georgian country house and associated structures, a corn mill converted into a house, and a war memorial.


Key

Buildings

References

Citations

Sources

Lists of buildings and structures in Shropshire